Caught in the Crossfire is the debut solo album by the English rock musician John Wetton, released in 1980 by E.G. Records. Featuring guitarist Martin Barre (of Jethro Tull), drummer Simon Kirke (of Bad Company), as well as saxophonist Malcolm Duncan (of Average White Band), whom Wetton had played with in Mogul Thrash. The album's release took place during a transitional period in Wetton’s career, after he had left U.K. but before he joined Wishbone Ash and then formed Asia.

Caught in the Crossfire has been reissued numerous times with various album covers. The artwork of the original UK vinyl edition was designed by Hipgnosis art studio. In the U.S., the album was first released in early 1986 by Jem Records.

Track listing

Personnel
John Wetton – vocals, acoustic & electric guitar, bass guitar, keyboards; production
Martin Barre – electric guitar (2, 3, 5 & 10)
Phil Manzanera – electric guitar (7)
Simon Kirke – drums & percussion
Malcolm Duncan – saxophone (7 & 9)

Technical personnel
John Punter – production and engineering
Martin Moss – engineering
Richard Mason – engineering
Nigel Walker – engineering
Sean Davies – mastering at Strawberry Studios
Hipgnosis – artwork

References

John Wetton albums
1980 debut albums
Hard rock albums by English artists
Pop rock albums by English artists
E.G. Records albums
Albums produced by John Punter
Albums produced by John Wetton
Albums with cover art by Hipgnosis